This is an incomplete list of notable alumni of the Bangladesh University of Engineering and Technology.

Academia 
 Ainun Nishat, academic, hydrologist and climate change specialist
 Abdul Matin Patwari, 4th vice-chancellor of BUET
 A. M. M. Safiullah, 10th vice-chancellor of BUET
 A.K.M. Fazle Hussain, academic at the University of Houston, recipient of the highest awards of the American Physical Society, American Society of Mechanical Engineers and American Institute of Aeronautics and Astronautics
 Alee Murtuza, 9th vice-chancellor of BUET
 Iqbal Mahmud, 7th vice-chancellor of BUET, recipient of the Ekushey Padak in the year 2005
 Jamilur Reza Choudhury, National Professor of Bangladesh, academic at several Bangladeshi universities, renowned civil engineer, former Adviser (Minister) to Caretaker government of Bangladesh, former president of the Institution of Engineers, Bangladesh and ex-president of the Bangladesh Mathematical Olympiad, recipient of the Ekushey Padak in the year 2017
 Kazi Khaleed Ashraf, academic, architect, Professor at the University of Hawaii
 Khaleda Ekram, academic, architect and first female vice-chancellor of BUET
 Latifur Khan, tenured professor and researcher at the University of Texas at Dallas, alumnus of the first batch to graduate from the Computer Science and Engineering Department of BUET in 1993
 M. Feroze Ahmed, professor and Civil Engineer, notable for his collaboration with MIT to understand the mechanism of arsenic contamination of groundwater in Bangladesh
 M. A. Rashid, first Vice-chancellor of BUET.
 M Rezwan Khan, Distinguished lecturer of Institute of Electrical and Electronics Engineers for the year 2017-18, recipient of Bangladesh Academy of Sciences Gold Model award for contribution to Physical sciences in 2005.
 M. Sam Mannan, Regents Professor and holder of the T. Michael O'Connor Chair I in the Artie McFerrin Department of Chemical Engineering at Texas A&M University, process safety pioneer in the United States.
 Mohammad Foyez Ullah, Academic and architect
 Mohd. Rafiqul Alam Beg, mechanical engineer and vice chancellor of Rajshahi University of Engineering & Technology (2014-2018)
 Muhammed Alamgir, geotechnical engineer and vice chancellor of Khulna University of Engineering & Technology (2010-2018)
 Muhammad Shahjahan, civil engineer and 6th vice-chancellor of BUET
 Musharrof Husain Khan, 5th vice-chancellor of BUET
 Muhammad Fazlul Bari, Civil Engineer, Member, Bangladesh Planning Commission; Vice Chancellor, RUET. Rajshahi  
 Musharraf Zaman, Lifelong David Ross Boyd Professor and Aaron Alexander Professor of Civil Engineering, University of Oklahoma (OU). Also serving as the director of Southern Plains Transportation Center situated in OU 
 Nasim Uddin, professor at University of Alabama, Birmingham, fellow of ASCE and notable researcher and author in the field of disaster risk management and structural safety 
 Nooruddin Ahmed, 8th vice-chancellor of BUET
 Saiful Islam, 13th Vice-chancellor of BUET. Recipient of Bangladesh Academy of Sciences Gold Model award for contribution to Physical sciences in 1988
 Saleh Uddin, architect and academic at Savannah College of Art and Design, Southern University and University of Missouri.  
 Satya Prasad Majumder, 14th vice-chancellor of BUET
 S. M. Nazrul Islam, 11th vice-chancellor of BUET

Engineering and architecture 

 Fazlur Rahman Khan, a Bangladeshi-American structural engineer and architect, considered the "father of tubular designs for high-rises", recipient of the Independence Day Award in the year 1999 which is the highest state award given by the Government of Bangladesh
 Kashef Mahboob Chowdhury, architect and winner of Aga Khan Award for Architecture in 2016
 Marina Tabassum, architect and winner of Aga Khan Award for Architecture in 2016
 Farhad Hussain, senior principal engineer at Broadcom Inc, design engineer at Intel, developed machine learning algorithms at National University of Singapore
 Sadia Afrin, senior commissioning manager at BC Housing - a branch of the Crown corporations of Canada 
 Mubasshar Hussein, architect, former president of the Institute of Architects Bangladesh
 Mustapha Khalid Palash, architect
 Syed Mainul Hossain, architect, designer of the National Martyrs' Memorial of Bangladesh, recipient of Ekushey Padak in the year 1987
Giasuddin Ahmed Choudhury, Water Resources Planner, Former Executive Director, CEGIS, Former Director General, Water Resources Planning Organisation, Additional Director General, BWDB

Entrepreneur 

 Mohammad Fazlul Azim, Chairman of Azim Group, a leading garments company in Bangladesh. A prominent industrialist and pioneer of Bangladesh RMG sector. Former Member of Parliament of Noakhali-6 constituency

Literature, media and entertainment 
 Abul Hayat, National Film Award winning actor from Bangladesh and civil engineer, recipient of Ekushey Padak in the year 2015 
 Anisul Hoque, writer, novelist, journalist
 Aupee Karim, National Film Award winning Bangladeshi actress, model and faculty member at architecture school of American International University-Bangladesh
 Gazi Rakayet, National Film Award winning Bangladeshi film director, actor and a civil engineer
 Habibullah Siraji, poet and former Director General of Bangla Academy, recipient of Ekushey Padak in the year 2016
 Naveed Mahbub, comedian, columnist, electrical engineer
 Shakoor Majid, architect, writer and photographer
 Tanzir Tuhin, architect, musician and former member of Bangladeshi music band Shironamhin
 Tauquir Ahmed, Bangladeshi architect, National Film Award winning film director, actor
 Ziaur Rahman Zia, architect, musician and founder of Bangladeshi music band Shironamhin
 Wahid ibn Reza, Bangladeshi Film maker and producer.

Military 
 Abul Hossain, an army Major General, former Director-General of BGB, former Engineer-in-Chief of the Bangladesh Army and former commandant of the Military Institute of Science and Technology
 Major General Md Jubayer Salehin, Engineer-in-Chief of the Bangladesh Army
 Shafi Imam Rumi, guerilla fighter of the Bangladesh Liberation War
 S I M Nurunnabi Khan, freedom fighter and writer. Recipient of Bir Bikrom award for gallantry in Bangladesh Liberation War
 Major General Siddiqur Rahman Sarker, Engineer-in-Chief of the Bangladesh Army (2015-2019)

Politics and government 
 G M Quader, mechanical engineer, politician and former minister of several ministries of Bangladesh
 Hasanul Haque Inu, politician, former Minister of Information of Bangladesh
 Kamrul Ahsan, diplomat and former civil engineer, former Dean of the Asia Pacific Diplomatic Group in Canada
 Siraj Sikder, Bangladeshi revolutionary politician
 Yafes Osman, architect, politician and minister of science and technology, Bangladesh

References